LG Chocolate is a brand name used for a variety of fashion mobile phones produced by LG Electronics, in a variety of color and models. The name covers two different phones' designs: one available in Asia, Europe, and Canada, and the other in the U.S. The Chocolates are mainly distinguished by their touch-sensitive arrow buttons and their sleek slider design. Common features of the phones include an MP3 player, games, camera and internet browser. The first model was part of the LG Black Label Series.

The LG Chocolate became very popular in many markets, especially the United States and South Korea.

The LG Chocolate which was introduced by LG in 2006 was the most popular phone in the company’s history. The Chocolate VX8500 phone managed to sell over 21 million handsets worldwide. LG is now paving the way for a successor to the LG Chocolate to celebrate its success.

Original LG Chocolate design
CYON Chocolate (LG-KV5900/LG-LP5900/LG-SV590), the South Korean original LG Chocolate (2005)
LG Chocolate (KG800/TG800), the GSM LG Chocolate released for Europe and Canada (2006)
LG Chocolate Platinum (KE800), the GSM LG Chocolate update (2006)
LG Chocolate Folder (KG810), the GSM original clamshell LG Chocolate (2006) (succeeded by LG U830, not branded as Chocolate)

North American LG Chocolate design
LG Chocolate (VX8500), the CDMA USA/Canada LG Chocolate (2006)
LG Chocolate Spin (VX8550), CDMA update (2007)
LG Chocolate 3 (VX8560), clamshell (2008)
LG Chocolate Touch (VX8575), touch screen version (2009)

New LG Chocolate design
LG New Chocolate (BL40), Europe/Asia/Canada LG Chocolate (2009)
LG New Chocolate (BL20) (2009)

Indonesian LG Chocolate design
LG Chocolate (ID90c), the CDMA Indonesian LG Chocolate (2006)

References

Chocolate